The 2012–13 Western Football League season (known as the 2012–13 Toolstation Western Football League for sponsorship reasons) was the 111th in the history of the Western Football League, a football competition in England. Teams were divided into two divisions; the Premier and the First. The season began on 4 August 2012.

The league champions for the first time in their history were Bishop Sutton. The champions of Division One were Sherborne Town.

Premier Division
The Premier Division featured five new clubs in a league of 20, increased from 18 the previous season after Merthyr Town were promoted to the Southern League, and Corsham Town and Sherborne Town were relegated to the First Division:
Buckland Athletic, promoted as runners-up in the South West Peninsula League.
Cadbury Heath, champions of Division One.
Melksham Town, runners-up in Division One.
Gillingham Town, third in Division One.
Winterbourne United, promoted from the Hellenic League.
Only Brislington and Hallen applied for promotion to Step 4 (Southern League Division One South & West), and one of them would have been promoted if their application had been accepted and that club won the league. If neither club won the league, one could have been promoted if a second- or third-place finish had been achieved. They could not both win promotion. However, Brislington failed to achieve the required ground grading, and Hallen failed to finish in a top three position, so no club was promoted.

League table

First Division
The First Division featured five new clubs in a league of 21, increased from 19 the previous season after Cadbury Heath, Melksham Town and Gillingham Town were promoted to the Premier Division:
Cheddar, promoted as runners-up in the Somerset County League.
Corsham Town, relegated from the Premier Division.
Cribbs Friends Life, promoted as champions of the Gloucestershire County League.
Sherborne Town, relegated from the Premier Division.
Warminster Town, transferred from the Wessex League.

League table

References
 League tables

External links
 Western League Official Site

2012-13
9